Christopher or Chris Mueller may refer to:

Chris Mueller (ice hockey) (born 1986), American ice hockey player
Chris Mueller (soccer) (born 1996), American soccer player
Kit Mueller (Christopher J. Mueller, born c. 1971), American basketball player

See also
Mueller (disambiguation)
Christopher Moeller (born 1963), writer and painter